The Abkhazian Letter was an 87-page document signed by 60 important representatives of the Abkhaz intelligentsia. The letter was completed on 17 June 1988 and sent to Mikhail Gorbachev. The authors of the letter defended the distinctness of Abkhaz people, i.e. their non-Kartvelian status, and listed Abkhaz grievances against the Tbilisi rule, incl. Georgianization.

References 

History of Abkhazia
1988 documents
1988 in the Soviet Union